Aquaman: Original Motion Picture Soundtrack is the soundtrack to the film of the same name. 
The music is composed and arranged by Rupert Gregson-Williams. It was released on December 14, 2018, by WaterTower Music. A deluxe edition containing 11 bonus tracks was released on July 19, 2019.

The album features an original song by American musician Skylar Grey entitled "Everything I Need", written by Grey and Elliott Taylor, the song is featured on the soundtrack and was released on the same day with the score album.

The score received generally positive reactions, who praised its thematic elements and use of synth, positively comparing it to Mark Mothersbaugh's score for Thor: Ragnarok.

Background
Rupert Gregson-Williams was the composer for Aquaman. Gregson-Williams previously wrote the score for Wonder Woman, the fourth film in the DC Extended Universe. In an interview with The Hollywood Reporter, Gregson-Williams stated that Aquaman was his most ambitious film to date. First discussions with director James Wan prompted Gregson-Williams to start writing the score even before he was even hired. The basis of the score started with a theme for Arthur's parents, Queen Atlanna and Thomas Curry which served as the cornerstone for the love story between them in the film. From there, he mapped out different character themes for Black Manta which uses a mixture of synths and beats, and the film's primary villain, Ocean Master which Gregson-Williams describes as a "non-melodic theme, but you have to be worried about this guy".

The score was recorded at the Eastwood scoring stage located at Warner Bros. Studios, Burbank with the Hollywood Studio Symphony with Alastair King and Nick Glennie-Smith serving as conductors. Andrew Kawczynski, Evan Jolly, Forest Christenson, Tom Clarke and Steve Mazzaro provided additional music. The choir section was recorded at Air Lyndhurst Studios with the London Voices choral ensemble.

Track listing

Charts

References

External links
 Official site

2018 soundtrack albums
2010s film soundtrack albums
DC Extended Universe soundtracks
Film scores
WaterTower Music soundtracks
Aquaman (film series)
Superhero film soundtracks